Rapsécourt is a commune in the department of Marne in the Grand Est Region of north-eastern France.

See also
Communes of the Marne department

References

Communes of Marne (department)